Zeibig is a German surname. Notable people with the surname include:

Emil Zeibig (1901–1981), French Olympic swimmer
Steffen Zeibig (born 1977), German Paralympic equestrian 

German-language surnames